The following lists events that happened during 1838 in Australia.

Incumbents

Governors
Governors of the Australian colonies:
Governor of New South Wales - Sir George Gipps
Governor of South Australia - Captain John Hindmarsh to 16 July then from 17 October Lieutenant Colonel George Gawler
Governor of Tasmania - Sir John Franklin
Governor of Western Australia as a Crown Colony - Captain James Stirling

Events
 1 January - John Pascoe Fawkner founded The Melbourne Advertiser, the Port Phillip district's first newspaper.
26 January - 
The 50th anniversary of the colony of New South Wales was celebrated with a regatta on Sydney Harbour and other festivities.
 A surprise attack by mounted police attack on a Kamilaroi camp organised by the colonial government killing at least 40 people. Part of the Waterloo Creek massacre.
31 January - Lord Glenelg, Secretary of State for War and the Colonies sent Governor Gipps the report of the Select committee of the House of Commons on Aborigines (British Settlements). The report recommended that Protectors of Aborigines should be engaged.  They would be required to learn the Aboriginal language and their duties would be to watch over the rights of Aborigines, guard against encroachment on their property and to protect them from acts of cruelty, oppression and injustice.  The Port Phillip Aboriginal Protectorate was established with George Augustus Robinson as chief protector and four full-time protectors.
 23 April 1838 - The arrival of the first German vinedressers in Australia. The barque Kinnear arrived at Sydney carrying six German vinedresser families who were one of the first group of foreign immigrants brought to Australia under the newly formed Bounty Scheme. They were Caspar Flick, Georg Gerhard, Johann Justus, Friedrich Seckold, Johann Stein, and Johann Wenz. They brought with them the first Riesling grape cuttings to Australia and worked in the vineyards belonging to John Macarthur's son William Macarthur at Camden Park. Major Edward Macarthur recruited these six families from the Rheingau region of Hesse in October 1837.
 24 May - David Jones opens its first store on the corner of George and Barrack Streets in Sydney 
 10–28 June - 28 Indigenous Australians were killed at the Myall Creek massacre.
 15 November - The Melbourne Cricket Club is founded 
 16 November - The ship Bengalee arrived at Port Misery (South Australia) with a group of Prussian immigrants, the first in a large wave of 19th-century German immigration to Australia.
 1 December - The first annual Hobart Regatta is held.
 Undated - Five nuns from the Religious Sisters of Charity in Ireland became the first women of religion to set foot on Australian soil.

Arts and literature
The Guardian: a tale published in Sydney by Anna Maria Bunn - the first Australian novel written by a woman

Births
 2 December - James Erskine, Commander-in-Chief, Australia Station
 7 December - Thomas Bent, one of Australia's more colourful politicians, and Premier of Victoria, is born in Penrith, New South Wales.
 15 December - John King, the sole survivor of the ill-fated Burke and Wills expedition, is born at Moy in the county of Tyrone, Ireland.
Bernhardt Holtermann
George Thorn
Barcroft Boake
Thomas Naghten Fitzgerald
John Henry Nicholson
John James Clark
John Horbury Hunt

Deaths
20 August – Joshua Gregory, Western Australian settler (b. 1790)
1 December – Thomas Pamphlett, convict and castaway (b. 1788)
John Harris
Samuel Terry
Solomon Wiseman
George Tobin
Robert Knopwood
Samuel Marsden
Aboriginals

References 

 
Australia
Years of the 19th century in Australia